The Pageant of Our Lord is a arts pageant produced by Rolling Hills Covenant Church in Rolling Hills Estates, California.  The pageant, started in 1986, presents the life of Christ through living art accompanied with narration, a 60-voice choir, and a full orchestra every year for 17 performances in the weeks leading up to Easter.  Since its founding, the show is believed to have been seen by over 160,000 people.  

Each year the pageant presents 14 works of art, and over the years the pageant has re-created over 40 art pieces that are stored and rotated through yearly to make the pageant different year after year.  Famous works of art recreated in the pageant include Leonardo da Vinci's The Last Supper and Michelangelo's Pietà which, due to popular demand, are included every year.  Music to accompany the art includes famous works such as Handel's Hallelujah Chorus, Modest Mussorgsky's The Great Gate of Kiev from Pictures at an Exhibition, and Martin Luther's "A Mighty Fortress is Our God".  The pageant is the creation of over 300 volunteers who help as models, make-up artists, actors, singers,  musicians, carpenters, ushers, and technicians.  

The pageant was founded and was the brainchild of Music Director David Halverson, who was inspired after seeing a performance of Pageant of the Masters in Laguna Beach, California, to transpose and produce a version that would illuminate as well as inspire against a Christian backdrop. The first production featured 6 works of art and man challenges to the founders of the pageant. The pageant has gotten coverage from media in the South Bay area as well as internationally for its original presentation of the life of Christ and the depths to which it has stirred audiences.

References

1. Pageant of the Masters

2. Tableaux Vivant

External links
Pageant of Our Lord Website
Rolling Hills Covenant Church Website
Article Regarding the 20th Anniversary Presentation of the Pageant in 2005

Recurring events established in 1986
Christian performing arts
Christianity in Los Angeles
1986 establishments in California